Armania may refer to:

 a misspelling of Armenia, a country in the South Caucasus region of Eurasia
 Armania (plant), a synonym for Encelia, a genus of the plant family Asteraceae
 Armania (insect) Dlussky, 1983, a genus of fossil ant-relatives, the type of the family Armaniidae
 Armania (mammal) Gabunia and Dashzeveg 1988, a genus of prehistoric mammals in the family Amynodontidae